Vox Cycle is a six composition or independent movement cycle for four amplified voices, and electroacoustic music by Trevor Wishart, composed between 1980 and 1988, associated with extended vocal techniques and the contemporary vocal composition.

The Cycle is focused on the relationship and the interpolation between natural sounds and human voice, the main musical interest of the composer on which he has been researching for a long time, starting from Red Bird composition  released through analog means. 

The poetics at the base of the work has linguistic and philosophical marks, regarding the relationship between creation and disintegration of man, between natural developments and failure of western culture and society. The Raw and the Cooked by Claude Lévi-Strauss suggested to the composer this central idea for his album.

All the movements included in the original record are performed by the Electric Phoenix ensemble, using the extended vocal techniques following the scores according to the composer's indications. The recordings of the voices in the electroacoustic compositions are related with animals, natural and mechanical sounds; the spectromorphological transformations of the voices and sounds are conducted by technological means, with four-channel spatialization for the performances. Vox V only is based on the recording of vocal sounds improvised by Wishart himself and the transformation of these.
Commissioned by IRCAM in 1981 and released in 1986, this composition resumes the characteristics of the entire cycle in its several production steps. From the poetical point of view, this movement represents the narrative climax; from the technical point of view it is the only piece conceived to be totally acousmatic while the other pieces have been composed to be performed. Vox V can be considered as the result of the research on the transformations of sound that Wishart has been conducting for a long time, which led to the creation of Sound Loom -  Composers' Desktop Project (CDP) software.
  
 The piece was first broadcast on the French Radio INA/GRM, within Acousmatique cycle.

The methodology at the base of the entire work is focused on the musical  space as sonorous continuum and the concept of transformation, from a spectromorphological point of view.
 The essential compositional device is the gesture in the sound continuum, the transformation from one sound propriety to another as from one symbol to another. 
 Wishart is focused on the dynamics and timbre evolution within the single musical events. In particular, regarding the interpolation between voice and other sounds, Vox V has perhaps the "classic sonic example of this process in the transformation from the voice to a swarm of bees and the return of the voice."

Finally, the work is openly dedicated to the human voice. The composer's interest is about the voice versatility as superior to any other musical instrument for sound production, although,  as the composer declared, he has been using the voice since the beginning because it was easier than recording natural or urban sounds through old analog means, when new technologies were not available.

Track listing 
 Vox I   (duration: 7:13, composition period: 1980-82, premiere: Paris Biennale 1985).
 Vox II  (13:01, 1982–84, Paris Biennale 1985).
 Vox III (15:58, 1985–86, Moebius Gallery, Boston).
 Vox IV  (10:38, 1987), Huddersfield Festival 1987).
 Vox V   (6:13, 1979–86, INA/GRM Cycle Acousmatique, Radio France 1987).
 Vox VI  (13:21, 1988, BBC Promenade Concerts 1988).

References 

1990 albums